Abdulatif Al-Ghanam (Arabic: عبد اللطيف الغنام; born 16 July 1985) is a footballer.

Club career
At the club level, he currently plays as a midfielder for Al-Hilal.

International career
Al-Ghanam has also played several matches for the senior Saudi Arabia national football team, including two qualifying matches for the 2006 FIFA World Cup.

Al-Ghanam also participated in the 2003 FIFA World Youth Championship.

References

External links

1985 births
Living people
Al Hilal SFC players
Saudi Arabian footballers
Al-Shabab FC (Riyadh) players
Saudi First Division League players
Saudi Professional League players
Association football midfielders
Saudi Arabia international footballers